Ptujska Cesta is a dispersed settlement in the hills west of Gornja Radgona in northeastern Slovenia.

Notable people
Notable people that were born or lived in Ptujska Cesta include the following:
 Matija Zemljič (sl) (1873–1934), Roman Catholic priest and poet

References

External links
Ptujska Cesta on Geopedia

Populated places in the Municipality of Gornja Radgona